Hasnizam Uzir (born 1975 in Johor Bahru) is a former Malaysian striker. He formerly played with Johor FA and Johor FC.

He also the former member of Malaysia Olympic Team (Malaysia U-23) in 1995.

Honours
Johor FA
Malaysia FA Cup: 1998

References

Living people
Malaysian footballers
1974 births
People from Johor Bahru
Association football forwards
Johor Darul Ta'zim F.C. players